Box Canyon may refer to:
Box Canyon (Colorado), a canyon in Ouray County, Colorado
Earl M. Hardy Box Canyon Springs Nature Preserve, in Thousand Springs State Park, Idaho; sometimes referred to as "Box Canyon State Park"
Box Canyon (Doña Ana County, New Mexico), a canyon in Doña Ana County, New Mexico
Box Canyon Site, an archaeological site in Hidalgo County, New Mexico
Box Canyon, Texas, a census-designated place in Val Verde County, Texas

See also
Box Canyon Dam (disambiguation)